Kim Dong-ho (born August 17, 1985) is a South Korean actor. He is mostly active in musicals.

In 2005, Kim began his acting career with the musical A Secret Garden. He then made his screen debut in the television series Twinkle Twinkle (2011), which earned him a Baeksang Arts Award nomination. He also appeared in the television series Wild Romance (2012), My Husband Got a Family (2012), Graceful Friends (2020), and Undercover (2021).

Theater

Filmography

Film

Television series

Variety show

Discography

Awards and nominations

References

External links
 
 

1985 births
Living people
Dankook University alumni
Male actors from Seoul
South Korean male film actors
South Korean male musical theatre actors
South Korean male stage actors
South Korean male television actors
21st-century South Korean male actors